Lei Xu, alternatively Lei Pu or Lei Bo, (died  209) was a military officer and rebel who was mainly active in the 200s in China. Initially loyal to warlord Yuan Shu, Lei Xu abandoned his master when the latter's regime collapsed, becoming an independent bandit. In 200, he accepted the authority of Liu Fu, an official loyal to Cao Cao, but rebelled again in 208. In the following year, he was killed by Cao Cao's general Xiahou Yuan.

Biography 
Lei Xu (then called Lei Pu) was first recorded as an officer serving under Yuan Shu, a warlord active during the end of the Han dynasty. Yuan Shu had declared himself "emperor of Zhong" in 197, resulting in a coalition of other warlords taking up arms against him. The "Zhong" regime quickly collapsed, and Yuan Shu fled his capital in 199. He travelled to the hills of Lujiang which were controlled by Lei Xu and another officer, Chen Lan. However, the two refused to accept their former superior, and drove him away.

By 200, Lei Xu, Chen Lan, and Mei Cheng were operating as bandits from Lujiang, using their dissident armies to plunder the area between the Yangzi and Huai River. Cao Cao, a powerful warlord who held the lands to the north, sought to restore some order to the region. He sent Liu Fu to become the inspector of Yang Province, and Liu managed to convince Lei Xu, Chen Lan, and Mei Cheng to submit.

In 208, Cao Cao suffered a maor defeat in the Battle of Red Cliffs at the hands of three rival warlords, Sun Quan, Liu Bei, and Liu Qi. In addition, Liu Fu died around 209. These events caused Lei Xu, Chen Lan, and Mei Cheng to rebel once more. Cao Cao responded by sending one of his generals, Xiahou Yuan, who defeated Lei Xu and evicted him from Lujiang. However, the rebel leader survived and still commanded a sizable force of followers; he fled westward and submitted to Liu Bei. The Records of the Three Kingdoms reported that Lei then settled in Jing Province with tens of thousands of followers, but sinologist Rafe de Crespigny considers these numbers to be an exaggeration. Despite his escape, Lei found only temporary respite, and was killed by Xiahou Yuan around 209.

See also
 Lists of people of the Three Kingdoms

Notes

References

Works cited 

Year of birth unknown
2nd-century births
209 deaths
Han dynasty people killed in battle